Actinotalea caeni is a Gram-positive, rod-shaped, non-spore-forming and non-motile bacterium from the genus Actinotalea which has been isolated from sludge from Korea.

References

External links
Type strain of Actinotalea caeni at BacDive -  the Bacterial Diversity Metadatabase

Micrococcales
Bacteria described in 2017